The 1981 Soviet Chess Championship was the 49th edition of USSR Chess Championship. Held from 27 November to 22 December 1981 in Bishkek. The title was won by  Garry Kasparov and Lev Psakhis. Semifinals took place in Bălți, Cheliabinsk, Nikolayev and Saratov; The First League (also qualifying to the final) wad held at Volgodonsk.

Qualifying

Semifinals 
Semifinals took place at Bălți, Cheliabinsk, Nikolayev and Saratov in July 1981. The winners respectively were Viktor Gavrikov, Leonid Yudasin, Vladimir Tukmakov and Georgy Agzamov gaining a direct promotion to the final.

First League 
The top five qualified for the final.

Final

References 

USSR Chess Championships
Chess
1981 in chess
Chess